Saccone is a surname. Notable people with the surname include:

Mario Saccone (born 1970), Argentine footballer 
Rick Saccone (born 1958), American politician
Pier Saccone Tarlati di Pietramala (1261–1356), Italian condottiero from Pietramala d'Arezzo, Tuscany, Italy

Surnames of Italian origin